Patristica Sorbonensia was a collection of academic works on patristically related themes, edited by Henri-Irénée Marrou and published by Le Seuil.

The volumes include:

1 Michel Spanneut; Le Stoicisme des Pères de l'Eglise, de Clément de Rome à Clément d'Alexandrie, 1957.

2 Marguerite Harl:Origène d'Alexandrie et la fonction révélatrice du Verbe Incarné, 1958.

3 Jean Meyendorf: Introduction à l'étude de Grégoire Palamas, 1959.

4 Pierre Riché: Education et culture dans l'Occident barbare VIe-VIIIe siècles, 1962.

5 Antoine Guillaumont: Les 'kephalaia gnostica' d'Evagre le Pontique et l'histoire de l'origénisme chez les Grecs et chez les Syriens, 1962.

6 Annie Jaubert: La notion d' Alliance dans le judaïsme aux abords de l'ère chrétienne, 1963.

7 André Méhat: Etude sur les "Stromates" de Clément d'Alexandrie.

8 Michel Meslin: Les Ariens d'Occident 335–430, 1967.

9 Henri-Irénée Marrou:Patristique et humanisme, Melanges, 1976.

Ancient Christianity studies